No Aircraft Noise, or more fully The Common Cause - No Aircraft Noise, was a minor Australian political party. It was dedicated to removing noise pollution for residents of Sydney, which is generated by the city's three airports. The party suggested that the airports should be shifted to the edge of Sydney, away from the dense residential areas. The party's former adherents included Greens MLC Sylvia Hale. Among its best results was a primary vote of 23.65% and two party preferred vote of 39.55% in the electorate of Marrickville in the 1995 state election and 13.61% in the inner-Sydney electorate of Grayndler in the 1996 federal election.

References

Aircraft noise
Defunct political parties in New South Wales
Political parties established in 1995
Political parties disestablished in 1999
Single-issue political parties
Single-issue political parties in Australia